Diane Ratnik-Cooper (born July 14, 1962 in Toronto, Ontario) is a retired volleyball player from Canada, who competed for her native country in two Summer Olympics: 1984 and 1996. A resident of Scarborough, Ontario, she finished in eighth and tenth place with the Women's National Team.

In January 2009, Diane was inducted into the University of Michigan Athletic Hall of Honor for her achievements on the 1981 Big Ten Championship volleyball team.

See also
 University of Michigan Athletic Hall of Honor

References
Canadian Olympic Committee

1962 births
Canadian women's volleyball players
Living people
Olympic volleyball players of Canada
People from Uxbridge, Ontario
Volleyball players from Toronto
Volleyball players at the 1984 Summer Olympics
Volleyball players at the 1996 Summer Olympics
Michigan Wolverines women's volleyball players
Expatriate volleyball players in the United States
Canadian expatriate sportspeople in the United States